Naty Bernardo (born 25 April 1911 – 4 January 1987) was a Filipino actress with a more than 40 year career. She is known for a variety of roles including as a martyr, character actress, and villain. Singer-songwriter JoAnne Lorenzana is her granddaughter.

Bernardo began her career at age 14 as a substitute singer for Sarswela Gabriel in
Manila. She became a soloist at the Lotus Theater and had bit parts in Malayan and Filippine movies until 1934 when she received a "second lead" role to Carlos Padilla, Sr. and Ana del Rosario in Sa Tawag ng Diyos (At God’s Call). She also had a major role in Ina (Mother) 1935, Ang Birheng Walang Dambana (Virgin Without a Shrine) in 1937, Siya’y Aking Anak (That Child Is Mine), Tunay na Ina (Real Mother) in 1939, and Mayroon Nga Bang Dios? in 1939. She had "martyr roles" and character roles. During the Japanese occupation of World War
II she performed in theater before continuing her film career with dozens of films for LVN Studios.

Filmography

References

External links

Filipino film actresses
1911 births
1987 deaths
Filipino stage actresses